Osman Nuri Eralp (1876—1940, Istanbul) was a Turkish politician, veterinarian and microbiologist.

Eralp was born in İstanbul, then in the Ottoman Empire, and now in Turkey. He completed his university education at "Mekteb-i Tıbbiye-i Mülkiye" which was the medical school of Darülfünun (House of Multiple Sciences, name of Istanbul University in Ottoman era). To continue studying for a post-graduate qualification, he attended Sorbonne and Pasteur Institute. After graduation, he worked as a veterinarian and also continued his researches. After 1908, he worked as a full-time academic at Istanbul University and Ankara University. He lectured on histology and embryology.

He notably contributed to the field of bacteriology via his research on microorganisms (tuberculosis, anthrax, cholera, syphilis, gonorrhea), and the field of virology by his research on rinderpest.

He wrote the first science fiction book in Turkey called Başka Dünyalarda Canlı Mahlukat Var Mıdır? (Are there alive creatures in other worlds?).

References 

University of Paris alumni
Turkish non-fiction writers
Scientists from the Ottoman Empire
Turkish virologists
Turkish bacteriologists
Turkish veterinarians
Academic staff of Istanbul University
1876 births
1940 deaths
Istanbul University alumni
Academic staff of Ankara University
Expatriates from the Ottoman Empire in France